Freya Ostapovitch (born 24 February 1956) is an Australian Liberal National politician who was the member of the Legislative Assembly of Queensland for Stretton from 2012 to 2015.

Ostapovitch was a candidate representing the Liberal National Party at the 2016 federal election for the seat of Rankin. She has claimed that abortions increase the risk of breast cancer.

References

External links

Liberal National Party of Queensland politicians
1956 births
Living people
Members of the Queensland Legislative Assembly
People from Kerkrade
Dutch emigrants to Australia
21st-century Australian women politicians
Women members of the Queensland Legislative Assembly